The cycle rickshaw is a small-scale local means of transport. It is a type of hatchback tricycle designed to carry passengers on a for-hire basis. It is also known by a variety of other names such as  bike taxi, velotaxi, pedicab, bikecab, cyclo,  beca, becak, trisikad, sikad, tricycle taxi, trishaw, or hatchback bike.

As opposed to rickshaws pulled by a person on foot, cycle rickshaws are human-powered by pedaling. Another type of rickshaw is the auto rickshaw.

Overview
The first cycle rickshaws were built in the 1880s, and they were first used widely in 1929 in Singapore. Six years later they outnumbered pulled rickshaws. By 1950 cycle rickshaws were found in every south and east Asian country. By the late 1980s there were an estimated 4 million cycle rickshaws in the world.

The vehicle is generally pedal-driven by a driver, though some are equipped with an electric motor to assist the driver.

The vehicle is usually a tricycle, though some quadracycle models exist, and some bicycles with trailers are configured as cycle rickshaws. Some cycle rickshaws have gas or electric motors.

Passenger configuration
The configuration of driver and passenger seats varies. Generally the driver sits in front of the passengers to pedal the rickshaw. There are some designs, though, where the cyclist driver sits behind the passengers. In many Asian countries, like Bangladesh, India and China, the passenger seat is located behind the driver, while in Indonesia, Malaysia, Cambodia and Vietnam the driver sits behind the passenger seat.  In the Philippines, the passenger seats are usually located beside the driver in a side car. Similarly, in the trishaw in Singapore and the sai kaa in Burma the passengers sit alongside the driver.

Nomenclature

The cycle rickshaw is known by a variety of other names, including:
 velotaxi (used in Germany)
 pussuss (used in parts of France)
 velotram (used in parts of France)
 bikecab
 cyclo (used in Vietnam and Cambodia)
 pedicab (used in the United Kingdom, United States and Canada)
 bike taxi (used in Buffalo, New York)
 bicitaxi (used in Mexico)
 taxi ecologico (used in Mexico)
 trishaw
 beca (used in Malaysia)
 becak (used in Indonesia)
 helicak (used in Indonesia) it's another version of becak but with engines, not manual pedals
 traysikad, trisikad, sikad or padyak (used in the Philippines)

Country overview
Cycle rickshaws are used in Asian countries, but also in countries outside Asia, such as large European and some North America cities. They are used primarily for their novelty value, as an entertaining form of transportation for tourists and locals, but they also have environmental benefits and may be quicker than other forms of transport if traffic congestion is high.  Cycle rickshaws used outside Asia often are mechanically more complex, having multiple gears, more powerful brakes, and in some cases electrical motors to provide additional power.

Africa

Madagascar
In Madagascar rickshaws, including cycle rickshaws or cyclo-pousse, are a common form of transportation in a number of cities. Rickshaws are known as pousse-pousse, meaning push-push, reportedly for the pulled rickshaws that required a second person to push the vehicles up hills. Cycles are more common in the hillier areas, like Toamasina.

Americas

Canada
In Canada there are pedicabs in operation in Victoria, British Columbia and Vancouver, British Columbia. They are regulated in Toronto, Ontario and Vancouver, British Columbia.

Mexico

In Mexico, they are called bicitaxi or taxi ecologico (literally "ecological taxi").

United States

In many major cities, pedicabs can be found rolling about city centers, nightlife districts, park lands, sports stadia, and tourist-heavy areas. Myriad uses have been discovered in the states, including car-park-to-event transport at large events nationwide. Thousands of pedicabs today operate on streets in locales including Green Bay and Milwaukee, WI; Austin, Tx; Manhattan, NY; Chicago; San Diego; Boston; San Francisco; Miami; Washington, D.C.; Denver; Portland, OR; Seattle; Charleston; New Orleans; Nashville; Phoenix; Salt Lake City; Philadelphia; and dozens of other hot spots. Manhattan sports the largest collection of pedicabs operating within city limits, and the City of New York itself has mandated that approximately 850 pedicabs always sport operating permits issued by the city.

Pedicabs in the United States seem to have gotten their start at the 1962 World's Fair in Seattle.

Asia

Bangladesh

Cycle rickshaws (রিকশা riksha) are the most popular modes of transport in Bangladesh and are available for hire throughout the country including the capital city Dhaka, known as the "Rickshaw Capital of the World". They are either pedal or motor-powered. They were introduced here about 1938 and by the end of the 20th century there were 300,000+ cycle rickshaws in Dhaka.

Approximately 400,000 cycle rickshaws run each day. Cycle rickshaws in Bangladesh are also more convenient than the other public modes of transports in the country namely auto rickshaws, cabs and buses. They are mostly convertible, decorated, rickshaws with folding hoods and are the only kind of vehicles that can be driven in many neighbourhoods of the city with narrow streets and lanes. However, increasing traffic congestion and the resulting collisions have led to the banning of rickshaws on many major streets in the city. Urban employment in Bangladesh also largely depend on cycle rickshaws. Because of inflation and unemployment in the rural areas, people from villages crowd in the cities to become rickshaw drivers locally called the riksha-wala (রিকশাওয়ালা).

Cambodia
Cycle rickshaws are known as cyclo (pronounced see-clo) in Cambodia, derived from the French cyclo.

China

Since the 1950s, when the pulled rickshaw was phased out, mid-city and large city passengers may travel using three-wheeled pedicabs, or cycle rickshaws. The Chinese term for the conveyance is sanlunche (三轮车). The vehicles may be pedal- or motor-powered. In Shanghai, most of the vehicles are powered by electricity.

Tourists are warned to beware of over-charging vendors, especially who wear an "old fashioned costume" or are located near tourist locations.

Whilst many local tourism authorities still issue licences for rickshaw drivers to carry passengers, authorities in China are tightening rules in order to alleviate cheating of tourists and to reduce traffic congestion (e.g. a typical Chinese cycle-rickshaw will travel at less than 10kmh and is wide enough to fill an entire motor or bicycle lane and therefore are blamed as a major cause of traffic congestion), and have been banned in many cities already.

India

The first attempt of improving the existing cycle rickshaws and then converting them to electric ones was done by the Nimbkar Agricultural Research Institute in the late 1990s.

Service availability
Cycle rickshaws were used in Kolkata starting about 1930 and are now common in rural and urban areas of India.

Ecocabs and similar service

Navdeep Asija started a dial-a-cycle rickshaw concept known as Ecocabs, Environmental friendly Ecocabs operate in the Punjab towns of Fazilka, Amritsar. Central Delhi and Kolkata. Passengers may call to request transport service, similar to dial-up taxi cab operations. 

In November 2010, Patiala GreenCABS, similar to Ecocabs, were introduced in the city by the local non governmental organisation (NGO) the Patiala Foundation.

Financing
In West Bengal the Rotaract Club of Serampore finances cycle rickshaw purchases so that unemployed people can begin their own rickshaw business. The loans are repaid from the workers' earnings. When paid in full, the rickshaw workers own their rickshaw and other unemployed individuals are entered into the program.

Soleckshaw
The Soleckshaw is a battery-electric assisted cycle rickshaw. The battery is designed to be charged or exchanged at centralised solar-powered charging stations. Developed by the Council of Scientific & Industrial Research, it was launched in Delhi in October 2008. However, in September 2010 it was reported that no Soleckshaws had been sold on a commercial basis, and the approximately 30 demonstration units, initially deployed in Ahmedabad, Chandigarh, Delhi, Dhanbad, Durgapur, Jaipur and Kolkata, were "not in operation due to various local administrative and management problems", and the charging stations "are not being used at this point of time as the vehicles are not in operation at those locations".

The 2010 Union budget of India had a concessional excise duty of 4% on solar cycle rickshaws.

Indonesia
Cycle rickshaws in Indonesia are called becak (pronounced ). They began being used in Jakarta about 1936. Becak were considered an icon of the capital city of Jakarta prior to its ban in the 1970s. Citing concerns of public order, the city government forbade them on the city's main streets. Scenes of the anti-becak campaign appear in the 1975 Canadian film Wet Earth and Warm People, a documentary by Michael Rubbo. Despite the attempts at eradication, however, many becak still operate near slums throughout the city. Attempts at reinforcing the ban resulted in large-scale seizures of the vehicle in the late 1990s and in 2007. In 2018, Governor Anies Baswedan attempted to allow becak again because of a political contract with becak drivers during his campaign.

There are two types of "becak" in Indonesia: the first type is the driver sitting behind the passenger (similar to Dutch-style cargo bikes), the other one which mainly found in Sumatra is the driver sitting beside the passenger. "Becak" is still being used in various part of Indonesia, especially in smaller cities and town.

Malaysia

In Malaysia, pedestrian-pulled rickshaws were gradually replaced by cycle rickshaws (beca in Malay, from Hokkien bé-chhia 馬車 "horse cart"). Cycle rickshaws were ubiquitous up to the 1970s in cities. Since then, rapid urbanisation has increased demand for more efficient public transport, resulting in dwindling cycle rickshaw numbers. Today, cycle rickshaws are operated mostly as a tourist attraction, with small numbers operating in Malacca, Penang, Kelantan and Terengganu.

Myanmar

In Myanmar, cycle rickshaws or trishaws (saik kar, directly pronounced as in the English word 'side car') came first into wide use in 1938, when the year-1300 revolution, which originated from the Chauk oil-field strike, inspired the people in Mandalay to have a consciousness of nationalism and to boycott British goods and services. The auto body technician Saya Nyo built the first trishaw in Mandalay by attaching a side-car to the side of an old bicycle. So two passengers are on the right of the driver.

Only two forms of transportation were then available in the city; the cab and the electric train. The latter could run only on six-mile tracks. Trishaws could reach every nook and cranny, so the spirit of nationalism plus the advantage of trishaws reaching everywhere made them so popular among Mandalayans that even the train company had to stop its business.

Nepal
In the Terai region of Nepal, cycle rickshaws are still the most popular means of public transport for short-distance commuting. Most big cities in the Terai have hundreds of cycle rickshaws that carry local commuters and travellers, and are also used for carrying goods. Since the Terai region is bordered with India, cycle rickshaws are also popular means for shoppers, businessmen and travellers to travel in and out of the country freely. The free border between India and Nepal enable the rickshaw owners from both countries to operate across the border without any restriction.
However, in Hilly regions of Nepal, cycle rickshaws are primarily used to attract tourists who can relax and travel around the popular streets and markets at reasonable fares. Cycle rickshaws are particularly popular among tourists to roam around the popular streets and markets of Thamel, Kathmandu.

Pakistan
The Cycle and Pulled rickshaw were banned in Pakistan in November 1991.

Philippines

In the Philippines, it is called a pedicab, traysikad, trisikad — or simply sikad or padyak, from the Philippine word meaning to tramp or stamp one's feet.  It is made by mounting a sidecar to a regular bicycle. They are used mainly to ferry passengers short distances along smaller, more residential streets, often to or from jeepneys or other public utility vehicles.  They are also used for transporting cargo too heavy to carry by hand and over a distance too short or roads too congested for motor transport, such as a live pig. During rainy seasons, they are useful as a way to avoid walking through flood waters.  Along with the jeepney, the motorcycle-powered tricycle, and the engine-powered kuliglig, the open-air pedicab provides shade when needed.

Thailand

In Thailand, any three-wheeler is called samlor (which literally means "three wheels"), whether motorised or not, including pedicabs, motorcycles with attached vending carts or sidecars, etc. The driver is also called samlor.

Vietnam

Cyclo was an invention of a french named P. Coupeaid, which was introduced in Cambodia and Saigon in 1939. From 2008 to 03/2012, due to the traffic obstruction, cyclos were totally forbidden in Ho Chi Minh City and other provinces, except cyclo tours organised by tourist agencies. Another similar vehicle, a pedicab called xe lôi of the Mekong Delta, are now rarely found in some provinces such as Sóc Trăng, Vĩnh Long and Châu Đốc. They are on their way to disappear.

Cyclo, a 1995 film about a cyclo driver, won the Golden Lion at the 52nd Venice International Film Festival.

Europe
Cycle rickshaws, also called pedicabs, are used in most large continental European cities.

Denmark

Copenhagen and Odense have pedicab service.

Finland
Cycle rickshaws are available for rent at Kaivopuisto in Helsinki. The rental company brought the vehicles from the city of Lappeenranta in 2009.

France
Most French cities have one or more pedicabs, locally known as PussPuss or VeloTaxi. Most common in Paris, Nantes, Lyon, Montpellier and Valence, these cities operate 1 or more units. France have pedicab vendors.

Germany

Lake Constance, Berlin, Frankfurt, Dresden and Hamburg offer cycle rickshaw, also called pedicab, service.

Velotaxi
In the 1990s, German-made cycle rickshaws called velotaxis were created. They are about 1/3 to 1/2 the cost of regular taxis. Velotaxis are three-wheeled vehicles with a "space-age lightweight plastic cab that is open on both sides", a space for a driver, and behind the driver, space for two passengers. They have been made in Berlin, Germany, by Ludger Matuszewski, the founder of "Velotaxi GmbH" company. Velotaxis are often used for group functions like weddings. Under German traffic laws, transporting people on bicycles was forbidden.

Electric assist pedicabs
Berlin's Senate, police, and taxi associations finally agreed that the "cult-flitzer" could be integrated into the city's traffic flow. Germany's highest court later ruled that transporting people on bikes was legal. It is a modern and newly designed pedicab (CityCruiser) with a 500-watt electric assist motor. Although these electric-assist pedicabs were engineered in Germany they are manufactured in the Czech Republic and some clones are now also produced in China. The Chinese clone can be purchased for about 3,000 US dollars; the German original is around 6,000 US dollars ( the newest version, 9000+ €). The batteries last about 4 hours with a full charge. As with a few recumbent and semi-recumbent designs, some drivers may suffer with knee and joint pain due to the weight of the vehicle (145 kg).

Hungary
Pedicab service is available in Budapest.

Ireland
Pedicabs operate in Cork and Dublin, Ireland.

Italy
Pedicab service is available in Florence, Milan, Rome, Bari.

The Netherlands
Pedicab service is available in Amsterdam, The Hague and in the Caribbean, at Willemstad.

Thomas Lundy of Amsterdam adapted his battery-electric assisted cycle rickshaw to become what he terms "semi-solar powered", resulting in a video report on Reuters.

Norway

Pedicab service is available in Oslo, Fredrikstad, Bergen, Porsgrunn and Tønsberg.

Poland

During World War II, when Poland was under Nazi German occupation, the German authorities confiscated most privately owned cars and many of the streetcars and buses. Because of that, public transport was partially replaced by cycle rickshaws, at first improvised and with time mass-produced by bicycle factories. Cycle rickshaws became popular in Warsaw and by the start of the Warsaw Uprising were a common sight on the city's streets.

Pedicabs still can be found in most large cities in Poland from Łódź to Warsaw.

Spain
Alicante, Barcelona, Zaragoza, Málaga San Sebastian and Seville have pedicab service.

United Kingdom
Cycle rickshaws operate in central London, including Soho, Piccadilly, Leicester Square, and Covent Garden. Pedal Me is a pedicab company using electric cargo bikes to transport passengers and cargo across Central and Inner London.
Rickshaws and pedicabs are found in the centre of Edinburgh where vendors are hired like taxis and provide tours. Pedicabs and their variants are also available in Oxford.

Oceania

Australia
Two companies operate pedicabs in Sydney. Pedapod operate 'pod' styled cabs from Queen Victoria Buildings to Circular Quay. Tikki Tikki Australia operate more advanced 'classic' styled cabs from the Central Railway Station to Circular Quay and up to Kings Cross and down to Star City Casino.Tikki Tikki also has pedicabs and rickshaws in London and Vancouver

Pedicabs are also found in Brisbane, Melbourne, Darwin, Perth, Gold Coast, Cairns, Townsville, Newcastle, and Byron Bay.

New Zealand
New Zealand has had pedicabs since the early 1990s. Auckland currently has 19 bikes mainly run by Bikeman and a few owner-operators.

Queenstown also has a fleet of Danish-made rickshaws run by a local entrepreneur.

Economic, social and political aspects

Economics

In many Asian cities where they are widely used, cycle rickshaw driving provides essential employment for recent immigrants from rural areas, generally impoverished men. One study in Bangladesh showed that cycle rickshaw driving was connected with some increases in income for poor agricultural labourers who moved to urban areas, but that the extreme physical demands of the job meant that these benefits decreased for long-term drivers. In Jakarta, most cycle rickshaw drivers in the 1980s were former landless agricultural labourers from rural areas of Java.

In 2003, Dhaka cycle rickshaw drivers earned an estimated average of Tk 143 (US$2.38) per day, of which they paid about Tk 50 (US$0.80) to rent the cycle rickshaw for a day. Older, long-term drivers earned substantially less. A 1988–89 survey found that Jakarta drivers earned a daily average of Rp. 2722 (US$1.57). These wages, while widely considered very low for such physically demanding work, do in some situations compare favourably to jobs available to unskilled workers.

In many cities, most drivers do not own their own cycle rickshaws; instead, they rent them from their owners, some of whom own many cycle rickshaws. Driver-ownership rates vary widely.  In Delhi, a 1980 study found only one per cent of drivers owned their vehicles, but ownership rates in several other Indian cities were much higher, including fifteen per cent in Hyderabad and twenty-two per cent in Faridabad. A 1977 study in Chiang Mai, Thailand found that 44% of cycle rickshaw drivers were owners. In Bangladesh, driver-ownership is usually highest in rural areas and lowest in the larger cities. Most cycle rickshaws in that country are owned by individuals who have only one or two of them, but some owners in the largest cities own several hundred.

Social aspects
In 2012 Ole Kassow, a resident of Copenhagen, wanted to help the elderly get back on their bicycles, but he had to find a solution to their limited mobility. The answer was a cycle rickshaw, and he started offering free cycle rickshaw rides to residents of a nearby nursing home. He then got in touch with a civil society consultant at the City of Copenhagen, Dorthe Pedersen, who was intrigued by the idea, and together they bought five cycle rickshaws and launched an organisation called Cycling Without Age, which has now spread to all corners of Denmark, and since 2015 to another 50 countries around the world.

Legislation
Some countries and cities have banned or restricted cycle rickshaws. They are often prohibited in congested areas of major cities. For example, they were banned in Bangkok in the mid-1960s as not fitting the modern image of the city being promoted by the government. In Dhaka and Jakarta, they are no longer permitted on major roads, but are still used to provide transportation within individual urban neighbourhoods. They are banned entirely in Pakistan. While they have been criticised for causing congestion, cycle rickshaws are also often hailed as environmentally-friendly, inexpensive modes of transportation.

In Taiwan, the Road Traffic Security Rules require pedicabs to be registered by their owners with the police before they can be legally driven on public roads, or risk an administrative fine of 300 new Taiwan dollars (TWD). Their drivers must carry the police registration documents or risk a fine of 180 TWD, but no driver licence is required. The administrative fines are based on Articles 69 and 71 of the Act Governing the Punishment of Violation of Road traffic Regulations. As Taiwanese road traffic is now heavily motorised, most pedicabs have been replaced by taxicabs, but they can still be found at limited places, such as Cijin District of Kaohsiung City.

Electric-assist pedicabs were banned in New York City in January 2008, the city council decided to allow pedicabs propelled only by muscle power. The city of Toronto, Ontario, Canada, has decided not to issue permits to electric-assist pedicabs.

Arts

As a key part of the urban landscape in many cities, cycle rickshaws have been the subject of films and other artwork, as well as being extensively decorated themselves. The cycle rickshaw in Dhaka is especially well known as a major medium for Bengali folk art, as plasticine cutouts and handpainted figures adorn many cycle rickshaws.

Films featuring cycle rickshaws and their drivers include Kickboxer and Sammo Hung's 1989 martial arts film Pedicab Driver, which dealt with a group of pedicab drivers and their problems with romance and organised crime. Cyclo, a 1995 film by Vietnamese director Tran Anh Hung, is centered on a cycle rickshaw driver. Tollywood films with cycle rickshaw themes include Orey Rickshaw ("Orey" literally means "Hey", in a derogatory tone), which tells a story sympathising with the downtrodden, and Rickshavodu ("Rickshaw Guy").

Gallery

See also

Rickshaws
 Auto rickshaw
 Pulled rickshaw
 Rickshaw
 Rickshaw art
Designer
 George Bliss (pedicab designer)

Other human-powered transport
 Bicycle trailer
 Boda-boda (bicycle taxi)
 Cargo bike
 Quadracycle
 Utility cycling

Cycles
 Bicycle
 Electric bicycle
 Outline of cycling
 Party Bike
 Tandem bicycle
 Trailer bike
 Tricycle

Notes

References

External links

 Becak Yogya

Cycle types
Vehicles for hire
Taxi vehicles
Rickshaws